The Old Mill is a 1937 Silly Symphonies cartoon produced by Walt Disney Productions, directed by Wilfred Jackson, scored by Leigh Harline, and released theatrically to theatres by RKO Radio Pictures on November 5, 1937. The film depicts the natural community of animals populating an old abandoned windmill in the country, and how they deal with a severe summer thunderstorm that nearly destroys their habitat. It incorporates the song "One Day When We Were Young" from Johann Strauss II's operetta The Gypsy Baron.

The Old Mill was the first Silly Symphony cartoon to be released by RKO and was added a new Silly Symphony logo, some new titles, and a burlap background which was used for several other Disney theatrical cartoon series like Donald Duck, Goofy, Mickey Mouse, and Pluto the Pup.

This Silly Symphonies cartoon was re-issued to theatres by Buena Vista Distribution.

Like many of the later Silly Symphony shorts, The Old Mill was a testing ground for advanced animation techniques. Marking the first use of Disney's multiplane camera, the film also incorporates realistic depictions of animal behavior, complex lighting and color effects, depictions of wind, rain, lightning, ripples, splashes and reflections, three-dimensional rotation of detailed objects, and the use of timing to produce specific dramatic and emotional effects. All of the lessons learned from making The Old Mill would subsequently be incorporated into Disney's feature-length animated films, such as Snow White and the Seven Dwarfs (1937), which was released a month later, as well as Pinocchio (1940), Fantasia (1940) and Bambi (1942).

In 2015, the United States Library of Congress selected the film for preservation in the National Film Registry, finding it "culturally, historically, or aesthetically significant".

Awards and accolades
The Old Mill won the 1937 Academy Award for Best Short Subjects: Cartoons. It was included as #14 in the book The 50 Greatest Cartoons As Selected by 1,000 Animation Professionals.

Homages

Disney California Adventure
The Old Mill is featured in the World of Color show at Disney California Adventure.

Disneyland

The three mills from the short were seen in miniature on the Storybook Land Canal Boats ride at Disneyland. Beginning December 20, 2014, they were replaced by landmarks from Disney's 2013 3D computer-animated musical film Frozen. The miniature windmills were put into storage by Walt Disney Imagineering.

Disneyland Paris
The Old Mill is represented at Fantasyland at Disneyland Paris by a building resembling a Dutch windmill, which serves drinks and snacks.

Magic Kingdom
A homage to The Old Mill is included on Tom Sawyer Island at the Magic Kingdom. Inside Harper's Mill, there is an owl and a bluebird's nest inside a broken cog in the mill's gears.

The Simpsons
The Old Mill was parodied in The Simpsons episode "Bart Has Two Mommies", where Homer tries to win a rubber duck race by making his rubber duck cross the finish line first. The duck however floats to an abandoned windmill very similar to the one in the Disney short, with a sign declaring: "The Old Mill." The scene where the duck is nearly squashed by the water wheel is a direct reference to the most famous scene of The Old Mill. Raymond Scott's "Powerhouse B" is heard in the scene where Homer protected the duck from the water wheel.

Voice cast
 Bird chirps: Louise Myers And Elvia Allman
 Crickets: Jean MacMurray And Purv Pullen
 Frogs: Clarence Nash
 Quartet: Jerry Phillips, Elvia Allman, Marie Arbuckle, Mary Moder, Bea Hager, Marta Nielsen, Barbara Whitson

Home media
The Old Mill was released on Laserdisc as part of Academy Award Review of Walt Disney Cartoons in 1985.

It was released on December 4, 2001 on the Walt Disney Treasures: Silly Symphonies DVD set and on March 1, 2005 on the Bambi Platinum Edition DVD as a special feature. The short was released for the first time on Blu-ray on October 6, 2009, on the Snow White and the Seven Dwarfs Diamond Edition and would subsequently be re-released with Bambi as part of its Diamond Edition and Signature Collection releases on Blu-ray. The short is also available to watch on the streaming service Disney+.

Influence 
Japanese director Hayao Miyazaki has called The Old Mill his favorite Disney film.

References

External links
 
 

1937 films
1930s color films
1937 short films
1930s Disney animated short films
Best Animated Short Academy Award winners
Silly Symphonies
Films directed by Wilfred Jackson
Films produced by Walt Disney
1937 animated films
United States National Film Registry films
Films scored by Leigh Harline
Animated films without speech
Works about windmills